Fall Brawl '96: War Games was the fourth Fall Brawl professional wrestling pay-per-view (PPV) event produced by World Championship Wrestling (WCW). It took place on September 15, 1996 from the Lawrence Joel Veterans Memorial Coliseum in Winston-Salem, North Carolina.

Production

Background
The WarGames match was created when Dusty Rhodes was inspired by a viewing of Mad Max Beyond Thunderdome. It was originally used as a specialty match for the Four Horsemen. The first WarGames match took place at The Omni in Atlanta during the NWA's Great American Bash '87 tour, where it was known as War Games: The Match Beyond. It became a traditional Fall Brawl event from 1993 to 1998.

Storylines
The event featured professional wrestling matches that involve different wrestlers from pre-existing scripted feuds and storylines. Professional wrestlers portray villains, heroes, or less distinguishable characters in the scripted events that build tension and culminate in a wrestling match or series of matches.

Event

Hollywood Hogan came to ringside late in the match between Randy Savage and the Giant, right after Savage had hit a flying elbow on Giant. Savage left the ring to chase Hogan, then was attacked by Scott Hall and Kevin Nash, who knocked Savage out with a chair. Referee Nick Patrick was arguing with Giant while this all was going on and didn't see anything, and Giant pinned the fallen Savage after the rest of the nWo carried him back to the ring. Due to the tension caused by the nWo's presence in WCW, a modification to the traditional WarGames Match rules was made. Instead of both teams coming to ringside before the match, each side stayed backstage and the participants entered from there one at a time. nWo Sting and Hogan forced Lex Luger to submit as nWo Sting had the Scorpion Deathlock locked in and Hogan held him down with a front facelock. Due to Team WCW doubting his allegiance, Sting abandoned Luger, Ric Flair and Arn Anderson shortly after entering and the match became a 4-on-3 handicap match. After the match Randy Savage came out to attack Hogan, only to be beaten down by the entire nWo. Miss Elizabeth was also attacked after she came down to plead with Hogan to stop.

Results

References

Professional wrestling in North Carolina
Events in North Carolina
1996 in North Carolina
Fall Brawl
September 1996 events in the United States
1996 World Championship Wrestling pay-per-view events